Kyrgyzstan competed at the 2022 World Games held in Birmingham, United States from 7 to 17 July 2022. Athletes representing Kyrgyzstan won one silver medal and one bronze medal. The country finished in 60th place in the medal table.

Medalists

Competitors
The following is the list of number of competitors in the Games.

Ju-jitsu

Kyrgyzstan won one silver medal in ju-jitsu.

Kickboxing

Kyrgyzstan won one bronze medal in kickboxing.

References

Nations at the 2022 World Games
2022
World Games